Brandon Isaac (born December 11, 1984) is a professional Canadian football linebacker who is currently a free agent. He has been a member of the Spokane Shock, Manchester Wolves, Milwaukee Iron, Calgary Stampeders, Hamilton Tiger-Cats, Saskatchewan Roughriders and Toronto Argonauts.

College football
Isaac played college football for the South Carolina Gamecocks. In his 2-year tenure with the Gamecocks, Isaac recorded 55 tackles, 1 interception, & 8 pass breakups.

Professional football
Isaac was a member of the 100th Grey Cup winning Toronto Argonauts.

References

External links
Toronto Argonauts bio

1984 births
Living people
African-American players of American football
African-American players of Canadian football
South Carolina Gamecocks football players
Spokane Shock players
Milwaukee Iron players
Saskatchewan Roughriders players
Calgary Stampeders players
Hamilton Tiger-Cats players
Manchester Wolves players
Toronto Argonauts players
American football defensive backs
Canadian football defensive backs
Players of American football from South Carolina
People from Blackville, South Carolina
21st-century African-American sportspeople
20th-century African-American people